Lütjenburg (Low German: Lüttenborg) is a town of the district of Plön, Schleswig-Holstein, Germany.

History

Lütjenburg was founded in the 12th century by Lord Holstein as a result of the conquest of the old territories of the Slavic peoples.

Politics
Since the local election in 2008, the CDU has ten and the  SPD nine seats in the 19-seats city council of Lütjenburg.

The member of the Bundestag for the electoral district of Plön-Neumünster is Philipp Murmann (CDU), who got 38.6 percent of all votes in 2009 and the member of the Landtag, in Kiel, is Werner Kalinka (CDU), who got 35.7 percent.

Economy
Due to the closeness to the Ostseebad Hohwacht many tourists visit Lütjenburg as well, to do some shopping or to visit the landmark of Lütjenburg, the "Bismarck Tower".

The 6th. antiaircraft regiment of the Bundeswehr was located in Lütjenburg till 2012, too. The Bundeswehr was the biggest employer in this region.

Education
Lütjenburg has an elementary school and, by now, still all other, continuative schools, the "Hauptschule" (a kind of general Junior High School, for non-intellectually gifted students), "Realschule" (Junior High School), "Gymnasium" (Senior High School). They are united in the "Schulzentrum Lütjenburg", a center of all these three continuative schools. But they are just united regarding the location. A special school (for intellectually challenged students), "Otto-Mensing-Schule" is also located in Lütjenburg.

Twin cities
  Rakvere (Estonia) 
  Sternberg (Mecklenburg-Western Pomerania)
  Bain-de-Bretagne (France)
  Ulyanovo (Russia, Kaliningrad Oblast)

References

Plön (district)